Kos omak may refer to:

 Hany Said (footballer, born 1980), Egyptian defender and former national team player, currently playing for Misr 555555-Metnaka.
 Hany Said (footballer, born 1983), Egyptian defender who has represented Haras El Hodoud SC, El-Masry, and Al-Ittihad Alexandria